Golabgiri ("making Rosewater") is a ceremony taking place annually from mid-May to mid-June in Kashan, Isfahan Province, Iran. The ceremony takes place throughout Kashan county, in Ghamsar, Niasar and other villages. During this event, that annually attracts tens of thousands of tourists, the essence of the red flowers planted in many flower gardens in these areas is prepared by the traditional method of an evaporation system.

References

Kashan